Charles Hartwell Bonesteel Jr. (April 9, 1885 – June 5, 1964) was a major general in the United States Army.  He commanded the United States Army Infantry School and the G-1 (personnel) staff section of Supreme Headquarters Allied Expeditionary Force during World War II.  He was the father of General Charles H. Bonesteel III.

Early life
The son of U.S. Army Major Charles Hartwell Bonesteel Sr. (1851 – 1902; West Point, 1876), the second Charles H. Bonesteel (pronounced "Bonn-eh-stel") was born at Fort Sidney, Nebraska, on April 9, 1885.  His mother Mary Greene Bonesteel, was the daughter of Oliver Duff Greene, who received the Medal of Honor for heroism at the Battle of Antietam.  Bonesteel graduated from the United States Military Academy in 1908 and was appointed a second lieutenant of Infantry.

Start of career and World War I
His initial assignments included postings in the Philippines, Hawaii and Texas.  During World War I he served with the 55th Infantry Regiment, and later at the Newport News, Virginia point of embarkation.

Post-World War I
From 1919 to 1924 Bonesteel was an instructor at West Point.

Bonesteel graduated from the United States Army Command and General Staff College in 1926 and served on the staff of the Chief of Infantry until 1930.  From 1930 to 1931 Bonesteel was assigned to the 18th Infantry Regiment, first as Commander of its 1st Battalion, and later as the regiment's Executive Officer, or second in command.  In 1932 he graduated from the United States Army War College.

From 1932 to 1940 Bonesteel's assignments included: Instructor and Section Chief at the Infantry School; Commander, 1st Battalion 2nd Infantry Regiment; and Commander of the 19th Infantry Regiment.

World War II
Beginning in 1940 Bonetseel's service covered several senior staff and command positions, to include: Chief of Staff, VI Corps Area and Second U.S. Army; Commander, Sixth Corps Area; Commander, 5th Infantry Division; Commander, Iceland Base Command; Commandant of the Infantry School; Commander, Western Defense Command; and Assistant to the Commanding General, Twelfth United States Army Group.  He was promoted to brigadier general in 1940 and Major General in 1941.

In 1944 Bonesteel was assigned as Commander of the G-1 (Personnel) Staff Section at SHAEF Headquarters.  He remained in this position until 1945, when he was assigned as Chief of the General Inspectorate Section for the U.S. European Theater of Operations.  Later in 1945 Bonesteel returned to the United States as President of the War Department Manpower Board, where he served until retiring in 1947.

Death and burial
Bonesteel died at Walter Reed Army Medical Center in Washington, D.C., on June 5, 1964.  He was interred at Arlington National Cemetery, Section 3, Site 1374-A.

Awards and decorations
 Army Distinguished Service Medal
 Legion of Merit
 Bronze Star Medal
 Honorary Companion of the Order of the Bath (United Kingdom)
 Légion d'Honneur (France)

Family
In 1908 Bonesteel married Caroline Standish Mead Hudson (1885–1965). Their children included daughter Eleanor and son Charles H. Bonesteel III. Eleanor Bonesteel was the wife of United States Air Force General Nils O. Ohman (1914–1993).

References

External links
Arlington National Cemetery: Charles Hartwell Bonesteel Jr.
ANC Explorer
Generals of World War II

|-

|-

|-

1885 births
1964 deaths
People from Sidney, Nebraska
People from Washington, D.C.
Military personnel from Nebraska
United States Military Academy alumni
United States Army Infantry Branch personnel
United States Army Command and General Staff College alumni
United States Army War College alumni
United States Army personnel of World War I
Burials at Arlington National Cemetery
Recipients of the Distinguished Service Medal (US Army)
Recipients of the Legion of Merit
Honorary Companions of the Order of the Bath
Recipients of the Legion of Honour
United States Army generals of World War II
United States Army generals